Emil William Breitkreutz (November 16, 1883 in Wausau, Wisconsin – May 3, 1972 in San Gabriel, California) was an American middle-distance runner who won a bronze medal in the Olympic 800 meters final in the 1904 Summer Olympics in St. Louis, Missouri.

Breitkreutz attended the University of Southern California (USC), where he became the first USC athlete to compete in the Olympics.  He graduated in 1906.

Breitkreutz was also the first head basketball coach at USC.

References

External links
 
 

1883 births
1972 deaths
American male middle-distance runners
Medalists at the 1904 Summer Olympics
Olympic bronze medalists for the United States in track and field
USC Trojans men's basketball coaches
USC Trojans men's track and field athletes
Athletes (track and field) at the 1904 Summer Olympics
People from Wausau, Wisconsin
Track and field athletes from Wisconsin